This is a list of the number-one songs of 2019 in Panama. The charts are published by Monitor Latino, based on airplay across radio stations in Panama using the Radio Tracking Data, LLC in real time. The chart week runs from Monday to Sunday.

During 2019, sixteen singles reached number one in Panama. Of those sixteen number-one singles, twelve were collaborations. In total, twenty-four acts topped the chart as either lead or featured artists, with eighteen—Felipe Araujo, Pedro Capó, Farruko, Snow, Silvestre Dangond, Camila Cabello, Juanes, Alessia Cara, Greice Santo, Jonas Brothers, Natti Natasha, Sech, Darell, Shawn Mendes, Jace López, Real Phantom, Nacho and Yandel—achieving their first number-one single in Panama.

Daddy Yankee's "Con Calma" was the longest-running number-one of the year and later ranked as the best-performing single of 2019 in Panama, leading the chart for fourteen non-consecutive weeks, becoming the fourth song with most weeks at number one in Panama following "Despacito" by Luis Fonsi and Daddy Yankee featuring Justin Bieber (2017), "Dura" by Daddy Yankee (2018) and "Mi Gente (Remix)" by J Balvin and Willy William featuring Beyoncé (2017–18).

Daddy Yankee and Sebastián Yatra were the only acts to have multiple number-one songs in 2019, with three apiece.

Chart history

References 

Panamanian music-related lists
Panama
2019 in Panama